Lesotho competed in the 2003 All-Africa Games held at the National Stadium in the city of Abuja, Nigeria The country sent a substantial team which entered a range of events including athletics and tennis. The team returned with six medals, all in taekwondo, and came sixteenth in the medal table.

Competitors
The Lesotho entered thirty events, twenty six for men and four for women. The country wielded a strong representation in tennis, with Mokoali Eche, Ntsane Moeletsi, Sekhobe Moshoeshoe and Lebohang Tsasanyane all competing in the men’s singles tournament. Tau Khotso ran in the 10,000 metres. A team also competed in the baseball tournament, coming fourth in the qualifying round and fifth overall.

Medal summary
Lesotho won six medals, two gold, a silver and three bronze medals, and was ranked sixteenth in the final medal table.

Medal table

List of Medalists

Gold Medal

Silver Medal

Bronze Medal

References

2003 in Lesotho sport
Nations at the 2003 All-Africa Games
2003